Members of the New South Wales Legislative Assembly who served in the 34th  parliament held their seats from 1944 to 1947. They were elected at the 1944 state election, and at by-elections. The opposition Democratic Party merged into the nascent Liberal Party in late 1944, becoming the New South Wales branch of the new party. The Speaker was Daniel Clyne.

See also
Second McKell ministry
First McGirr ministry
Results of the 1944 New South Wales state election
Candidates of the 1944 New South Wales state election

References

Members of New South Wales parliaments by term
20th-century Australian politicians